Marcel Moussy (7 May 1924 – 10 August 1995) was a French screenwriter and television director.

Moussy was born in Algiers.  He was co-nominated with François Truffaut for the Academy Award for Best Original Screenplay for the film The 400 Blows (1959).  He died in Caen, aged 71.

Selected filmography
 The Verdict (1959)
 The 400 Blows (1959)
 Le Maître de pension (1973 - writer and director)

References

External links 

1924 births
1995 deaths
French male screenwriters
20th-century French screenwriters
French television directors
People from Algiers
20th-century French male writers